Liolaemus magellanicus, Magellan's tree iguana, is a species of lizard in the family Iguanidae.  It is found in Patagonia and Isla Grande de Tierra del Fuego in Chile and Argentina. It is the southernmost lizard of the World.

References

magellanicus
Lizards of South America
Reptiles of Chile
Reptiles described in 1853